Events from the year 1826 in the United Kingdom.

Incumbents
 Monarch – George IV
 Prime Minister – Robert Jenkinson, 2nd Earl of Liverpool (Tory)
 Foreign Secretary – George Canning 
 Parliament – 7th (until 2 June), 8th (starting 25 July)

Events
 30 January – the Menai Suspension Bridge, built by engineer Thomas Telford, is opened between the island of Anglesey and the mainland of Wales.
 11 February – University College London is founded, under the name University of London.
 15 February – Longstone Lighthouse first illuminated as Outer Farne Lighthouse (Joseph Nelson, engineer).
 24 February – Treaty of Yandabo cedes Arakan peninsula to Britain, ending the First Anglo-Burmese War.
 April – a number of leading scientists form the Zoological Society of London.
 1 June to 31 August – A three-month heat wave and drought grips the country. With a mean temperature of  this is the hottest summer on the CET records, since 1659, until 1976. After which, it is the second hottest on record.
 19 June – Tories under Robert Jenkinson, 2nd Earl of Liverpool win a substantial an increased majority over the Whigs in the general election.
 20 June – Treaty of Bangkok increases British control over south-east Asia.
 1 July – the Conway Suspension Bridge, built by engineer Thomas Telford, is opened in North Wales, completing his improvements to the Holyhead road.
 10 August – the first Cowes Regatta is held on the Isle of Wight.
 18 August – explorer Alexander Gordon Laing becomes the first European to reach Timbuktu.
 26 September – Alexander Laing murdered in Timbuktu.

Ongoing events
 Anglo-Ashanti war (1823–1831)

Undated
 Country Bankers Act 1826 permits joint-stock banks outside the London area, which may issue banknotes.
 The British crown colony of the Straits Settlements is established.
 Construction of the National Monument, Edinburgh on Calton Hill (to the dead of the Napoleonic Wars) is commenced; it will never be completed.

Publications
 Benjamin Disraeli's (anonymous) first novel Vivian Grey.
 Walter Scott's (anonymous) historical novel Woodstock.
 Felicia Dorothea Hemans' poem Casabianca, in The New Monthly Magazine (August).
 Christian Isobel Johnstone (as Margaret Dods)'s The Cook and Housewife's Manual.
 John C. Loudon's periodical The Gardener's Magazine first issued.

Births
 24 January – Gifford Palgrave, priest, traveller and Arabist (died 1888)
 3 February – Walter Bagehot, economist and journalist (died 1877)
 15 February – George Johnstone Stoney, Irish-born physicist (died 1911)
 20 April – Dinah Craik, née Mulock, novelist and poet (died 1887)
 15 or 25 May – Tom Sayers, bare-knuckle boxer (died 1865)
 26 May – Richard Carrington, astronomer (died 1875)
 18 June – William Maclagan, Archbishop of York (died 1910)
 24 June – George Goyder, surveyor-general of South Australia (died 1898)
 7 July – John Fowler, agricultural engineer (died 1864)
 20 July – Laura Keene, actress (died 1873)
 25 August – William Synge, diplomat and author (died 1891)
 5 September – John Wisden, cricketer, creator of Wisden Cricketers' Almanack (died 1884)
 8 September – Sir James Corry, 1st Baronet, politician (died 1891)
 24 September – George Price Boyce, Pre-Raphaelite watercolour landscape painter (died 1897)
 23 December – William Blanchard Jerrold, journalist and biographer (died 1884)

Deaths
 6 January – John Farey Sr., polymath (born 1766)
 17 February – John Manners-Sutton, politician (born 1752)
 7 March – Ann Freeman, Bible preacher (born 1797)
 10 March – John Pinkerton, antiquarian (born 1758)
 3 April – Reginald Heber, bishop, poet and travel writer (born 1783)
 19 April – John Milner, Roman Catholic bishop and religious controversialist (born 1752)
 23 June – John Taylor, Unitarian hymn writer (born 1750) 
 5 July – Sir Stamford Raffles, colonial governor, founder of Singapore (born 1781)
 2 August – George Finch, 9th Earl of Winchilsea, cricketer (born 1752)
 26 August – Lady Sarah Lennox, courtier (born 1745)
 4 September – Robert Gifford, 1st Baron Gifford, lawyer, judge and politician (born 1779)
 26 September – Alexander Gordon Laing, Scottish explorer (born 1794)
 26 November – John Nichols, printer and author (born 1745)
 7 December – John Flaxman, sculptor (born 1755)
 31 December – William Gifford, satirist (born 1756)

See also
 1826 in Scotland

References

 
Years of the 19th century in the United Kingdom